Magnificent Desolation: Walking on the Moon 3D is a 2005 IMAX 3D documentary film about the first humans on the Moon, the twelve astronauts in the Apollo program.

It is co-written, produced and directed by Mark Cowen, and co-written, produced by and starring Tom Hanks.

Production

The film includes historical NASA footage as well as re-enactments and computer-generated imagery. Tom Hanks is the narrator, co-writer and co-producer. Magnificent Desolation is the third Apollo-related project for Hanks: he was previously involved in the film Apollo 13 and the miniseries From the Earth to the Moon. The cast includes Andrew Husmann, Aaron White, Brandy Blackledge, Gary Hershberger, and Scott Wilder. The voice cast includes Morgan Freeman, John Travolta, Paul Newman, Matt Damon, Matthew McConaughey. Bryan Cranston and Peter Scolari reprised their From the Earth to the Moon roles as Buzz Aldrin and Pete Conrad, respectively; many of the other actors had previously portrayed different people depicted in the film, in From the Earth to the Moon, The Right Stuff, and/or Apollo 13.

Score by James Newton Howard and Blake Neely.

The film was released in IMAX theaters on September 23, 2005. It was released on DVD on November 6, 2007.

Origins of title

The title comes from Buzz Aldrin's description of the lunar landscape:
 Aldrin: Beautiful view!
 Armstrong: Isn't that something! Magnificent sight out here.
 Aldrin: Magnificent desolation.
Aldrin's statement was substantially predicted nineteen years earlier in the film, Destination Moon, in which Charles Cargraves, the fictional second man on the Moon, states "The first impression is one of utter barrenness and desolation."
Without Aldrin realising it, he was also quoting the Wilkie Collin's classic "The Moonstone":
'..I resolved not to leave Kattiawar, without looking once more on the magnificent desolation of Somnauth..'

Cast
 Tom Hanks as The Narrator (voice) [portrayed Jim Lovell in Apollo 13 and hosted From the Earth to the Moon eps. 1-11]
 John Corbett as Harrison Schmitt (voice)
 Andrew Husmann as David Scott
 Bryan Cranston as Buzz Aldrin (voice) [reprised From the Earth to the Moon role, portrayed Gus Grissom in That Thing You Do]
 Aaron White as James Irwin
 Matt Damon as Alan Shepard (voice)
 Gary Hershberger as Astronaut Grace
 Morgan Freeman as Neil Armstrong (voice)
 Scott Wilder as Astronaut Wallace
 Brandy Blackledge as Future Astronaut
 Scott Glenn as Charles Duke (voice) [portrayed Alan Shepard in The Right Stuff]
 Rick Gomez as Alpha Station Commander (voice)
 Colin Hanks as Conspiracy Neil Armstrong
 Bo Stevenson as Conspiracy Grip
 Frank John Hughes as Future Houston Capcom (voice)
 Tim Matheson as Houston Capcom (voice)
 Matthew McConaughey as Alan Bean (voice)
 Neal McDonough as Reservoir Commander (voice)
 Paul Newman as David Scott (voice)
 Bill Paxton as Edgar Mitchell (voice) [portrayed Fred Haise in Apollo 13]
 Barry Pepper as John Young (voice)
 Kevin Pollak as Director (voice) [portrayed Joe Shea in From the Earth to the Moon and the voice of Pres. Eisenhower in The Right Stuff]
 Julie Shimer as Future Astronaut (voice)
 Gary Sinise as Eugene Cernan (voice) [portrayed Ken Mattingly in Apollo 13]
 Peter Scolari as Pete Conrad (voice) [reprised From the Earth to the Moon ep. 1 role]
 John Travolta as James Irwin (voice)
 Donnie Wahlberg as Helium 3 Commander (voice)
 Rita Wilson as Beta Station Commander (voice) [portrayed Susan Borman in From the Earth to the Moon]

Awards

On February 16, 2006, Jack Geist, Johnathan Banta, and Jerome Morin received the award for Outstanding Visual Effects in a Special Venue Film from the Visual Effects Society for their work on the film.

See also
 Apollo 11 in popular culture

References

External links
 Magnificent Desolation: Walking on the Moon 3D official web site
 
 Preview: Magnificent Desolation by Jeff Foust, The Space Review, August 1, 2005
 Review: Magnificent Desolation by Jeff Foust, The Space Review, September 26, 2005
 Review: Magnificent Desolation by Robert Pearlman, collectSPACE, September 20, 2005

2005 films
2005 short documentary films
IMAX short films
Films about astronauts
Films about the Apollo program
Playtone films
American short documentary films
Documentary films about the space program of the United States
2005 3D films
American 3D films
3D short films
Films produced by Tom Hanks
Films with screenplays by Tom Hanks
Films scored by Blake Neely
IMAX documentary films
Documentary films about outer space
Cultural depictions of Neil Armstrong
Cultural depictions of Dwight D. Eisenhower
Cultural depictions of Buzz Aldrin
3D documentary films
Harrison Schmitt
David Scott
James Irwin
Alan Bean
Alan Shepard
Charles Duke
Edgar Mitchell
John Young (astronaut)
Pete Conrad
Gene Cernan
2000s English-language films
2000s American films